Mervyn Inverarity (25 October 1907 – 17 March 1979) was an Australian cricketer who played 26 first-class matches for Western Australia between 1925 and 1940. 

Inverarity attended Scotch College, Perth, in the 1920s, also playing for Western Australia Colts during the same period. He made his first-class debut for Western Australia against South Australia in October 1925, recording innings figures of 6/179 on debut. 

During his career, Inverarity scored 736 runs at an average of 17.11, with a highest score of 68*. He also took 53 wickets at an average of 39.69, with a best bowling of 6/162. Inverarity captained Western Australia in two matches in the 1939–40 season. He also captained Fremantle District Cricket Club in the Western Australian Grade Cricket competition, and holds the all-time career runs aggregate record for the club, with 6133 runs. His son John Inverarity played Test cricket for Australia.

References

1907 births
1979 deaths
Australian cricketers
People educated at Scotch College, Perth
Western Australia cricketers
Cricketers from Perth, Western Australia